Aircraft marshalling is visual signalling between ground personnel and pilots on an airport, aircraft carrier or helipad.

Activity

Marshalling is one-on-one visual communication and a part of aircraft ground handling. It may be as an alternative to, or additional to, radio communications between the aircraft and air traffic control. The usual equipment of a marshaller is a reflective safety vest, a helmet with acoustic earmuffs, and gloves or marshalling wands–handheld illuminated beacons.

At airports, the marshaller signals the pilot to keep turning, slow down, stop, and shut down engines, leading the aircraft to its parking stand or to the runway. Sometimes, the marshaller indicates directions to the pilot by driving a "Follow-Me" car (usually a yellow van or pick-up truck with a checkerboard pattern) prior to disembarking and resuming signalling, though this is not an industry standard.

At busier and better equipped airports, marshallers are replaced on some stands with a Visual Docking Guidance System (VDGS), of which there are many types.

On aircraft carriers or helipads, marshallers give take-off and landing clearances to aircraft and helicopters, where the very limited space and time between take-offs and landings makes radio communications a difficult alternative.

U.S. Air Force procedures
Per the most recent U.S. Air Force marshalling instructions from 2012, marshallers "must wear a sleeveless garment of fluorescent international orange. It covers the shoulders and extends to the waist in the front and back. [...] During daylight hours, marshallers may use high visibility paddles. Self-illuminating wands are required at night or during restricted visibility."

Marshallers, like other ground personnel, must use protective equipment like protective goggles or "an appropriate helmet with visor, when in rotor wash areas or in front of an aircraft that is being backed using the aircraft's engines."
It also prescribes "earplugs, muff-type ear defenders, or headsets in the immediate area of aircraft that have engines, Auxiliary Power Unit, or Gas Turbine Compressor running."

Noise exposure 
Excessive noise can cause hearing loss in marshallers, either imperceptibly over years or after a one-time acoustic trauma. In the United States noise limits at work are set by the Occupational Safety and Health Administration (OSHA).

Fixed wing aircraft hand signals 

Despite efforts to standaridize aspects of aviation communication, such as terminology and language, hand signals used to guide aircraft on the ground still vary between various major organizations, such as the International Civil Aviation Organization North Atlantic Treaty Organization, and the Federal Aviation Administration.

FAA hand signals
During darkness or periods of poor visibility, the signals remain the same, but the signaler should use illuminated marshaling wands, or another handheld light source.

Helicopter signals

References

External links

 UK marshalling signals, airfield markings and lighting standards., from the CAA.

Aircraft ground handling
Articles containing video clips
Sign systems